Vanessa vulcania, the Canary red admiral, is a butterfly of the family Nymphalidae. It is found on the Canary Islands (except Lanzarote) and Madeira. Previously, it was considered a subspecies of Vanessa indica, but has been raised to species level after research by Leestmans in 1992.

The wingspan is 54–60 mm. It is darker coloured [than Vanessa indica], with the band of the forewing lighter red and strongly sinuate, and particularly large spots in the narrow marginal band of the hindwing, the apex of the forewing, moreover, being more angulate than in atalanta. Vanessa occidentalis Fldr. is a smaller and darker form from Madeira, of which single specimens are also recorded from Portugal

The larvae feed on Urtica morifolia and Urtica urens.

References 

 , 2012: Notes on the preimaginal stages of Vanessa vulcania (Godart, 1819) and differences in the structure of the egg with respect to Vanessa indica (Herbst, 1794) (Lepidoptera, Nymphalidae).  Atalanta 43 (1/2): 87-90. Full article: .

External links
Captain's European Butterfly Guide

vulcania
Butterflies of Europe
Butterflies described in 1819
Taxa named by Jean-Baptiste Godart